The Lonja de la Seda or Llotja de la Seda (English "Silk Exchange") is a late Valencian Gothic-style civil building in Valencia, Spain. It is a principal tourist attraction in the city.

History
Built between 1482 and 1533, la Lonja is composed of three parts (plus the Orange Garden - a walled court-yard). The main hall, Sala de Contratacion (The Trading Hall), is a large lavishly decorated space supported by gorgeous twisted columns. This was the financial centre of La Lonja, where the merchants work out contracts. The side-wing is named the Pavilion of the Consulate, and this was the seat of the Tribunal del Mar - the first marine merchant tribunal to ever be formed in Spain. The first two floors were the main function rooms, with the upper one hosting a richly decorated ceiling. These rooms are still maintained original furnishings. On occasion, the Tribunal would imprison merchants for debts in the central tower of La Lonja - the third part of the structure.

Behind the current building, there was an earlier one from the 14th century, which was called the Oil Exchange (Llotja de l’Oli, in Valencian, or Lonja del Aceite, in Spanish). It was used not only for trading with agricultural oils, but for all kind of business. Where in 1348 was traded perxal (percale) as some kind of silk.

Valencia's commercial prosperity reached its peak during the 15th century, and led to the construction of a new building. The design of the new Lonja of Valencia was derived from a similar structure in the Lonja of Palma de Majorca, built by the architect Guillem Sagrera in 1448. The architect in charge of the new Lonja was Pere Compte, who built the main body of the building – the Trading Hall (or Sala de Contractació in Valencian) – in only fifteen years (1483–1498). So is written in a blue band that runs along all four walls of the Trading Hall, also called "Hall of Columns". It proclaims in golden letters the following inscription:

According to the local Valencian scholar Joan Francesc Mira, this inscription showed that it was not a necessary to be a Protestant or a foreigner to establish the basis of a good trade; it also showed the union of ethics and economy. Other construction and decoration works lumbered on until 1548, such as the Consolat del Mar (Consulate of the Sea), a Renaissance building adjoined to La Lonja.

During subsequent centuries, La Lonja functioned as a silk exchange. The honesty of its traders is honored by the inscription that runs around the main contract hall.

In 1996 UNESCO listed it as a World Heritage Site. Its listing states that "the site is of outstanding universal value as it is a wholly exceptional example of a secular building in late Gothic style, which dramatically illustrates the power and wealth of one of the great Mediterranean mercantile cities."

See also
Llotja

References

External links

 Materials from the World Heritage website
 La Lonja de la Seda de Valencia UNESCO collection on Google Arts and Culture

Buildings and structures completed in 1548
Buildings and structures in Valencia
Gothic architecture in the Valencian Community
Silk
World Heritage Sites in Spain
Tourist attractions in Valencia
Bien de Interés Cultural landmarks in the Province of Valencia
1548 establishments in Spain